James Dickey coached the Texas Tech Red Raiders basketball teams from 1991 to 2001.

1991–92

Source:

1992–93

1993–94

Source:

1994–95

1995–96

1996–97

The Texas Tech Red Raiders became a charter member of the Big 12 Conference. Due to NCAA violations, Texas Tech was forced to vacate all conference wins during the 1996–97 NCAA Division I men's basketball season and two postseason wins during the 1996 NCAA Men's Division I Basketball Tournament

Source:

1997–98

Source:

1998–99

Source:

1999–2000

Source:

2000–01

Source:

References

Texas Tech Red Raiders basketball seasons